Sir Douglas Arthur Lovelock, KCB (7 September 1923 – 30 July 2014) was an English civil servant and Church of England asset manager. Having entered the civil service in 1949, he served as Chairman of the Board of Customs and Excise from 1978 to 1983, and then First Church Estates Commissioner from 1983 to 1993, also chairing the Central Board of Finance of the Church of England from 1983 to 1992.

He attracted controversy when it emerged that there had been a £500m fall in value in the Church of England's property portfolio in 1989–90, owing to the decision to borrow to invest in commercial property investments in the mid-1980s before the market sunk and interest rates rose.

References 

1923 births
2014 deaths
English civil servants
Knights Companion of the Order of the Bath
Church Estates Commissioners